Köstendorf is a municipality in the district of Salzburg-Umgebung in the state of Salzburg in Austria.

Geography
Köstendorf lies 15 km northeast of the city  of Salzburg on the Wallersee. It borders on the municipalities of Neumarkt am Wallersee, Seekirchen, and Schleedorf.

References

Cities and towns in Salzburg-Umgebung District